The Samdani Art Foundation is a private art foundation founded in 2011 in Dhaka, Bangladesh that aims to increase artistic engagement between the art and architecture of Bangladesh and the rest of the world.
It is best known for producing the bi-annual Dhaka Art Summit, which is the highest daily visited contemporary art exhibition in the world, welcoming over 477,000 visitors in its fifth edition in February 2020. The foundation produces education programmes and exhibitions across the year in collaboration with Bangladeshi and international institutions, and is one of the most active art institutions in South Asia.

Founders 

Founded in 2011 by collector couple Nadia Samdani MBE and Rajeeb Samdani, the foundation has enabled Bangladeshi artists to expand their creative horizons through production grants, residencies, education programs, and exhibitions. The foundation produces the bi-annual Dhaka Art Summit, which is the world's largest non-commercial platform for South Asian Art. The foundation also collects art from all over the world, and the collection is available for Bangladeshi audiences to view (by appointment). The founders have also donated works from their collection to institutions such as Tate and the Metropolitan Museum of Art to put Bangladeshi modern art in a wider international context.
The foundation is led by American curator Diana Campbell Betancourt who is the artistic director of the foundation. Through the works it has produced, research it has supported, loans from its collection, sponsorship, and traveling exhibitions it has commissioned, Samdani Art Foundation has been associated with some of the world's leading institutions in the Asia Pacific, Europe, Africa, and North America including the Metropolitan Museum of Art, the Swiss Institute and the Museum of Modern Art (MoMA) in New York, the Getty Foundation in Los Angeles, Para Site, M+, and the Asia Art Archive in Hong Kong, the Museum of Modern Art in Warsaw, Alserkal Avenue and Art Jameel in Dubai, the Venice Biennale, Documenta in Athens and Kassel, the Kunsthalle Zurich, the Kunstalle Basel, the Liverpool Biennial, Tate Modern and the Delfina Foundation in London, Singapore Biennale, the Kochi Biennale in India, The Asia Pacific Triennale at QAGOMA in Brisbane, the Shanghai Biennale, the Times Museum in Guangzhou, OCA in Oslo and the Kunsthall Trondheim in Norway, the Fiorucci Art Trust's Volcano Extravaganza in Stromboli, Berlin Biennale, Kettle's Yard in Cambridge, The Museum of Modern and Contemporary Art Sri Lanka, Museum MAIIAM in Chiang Mai, the Lahore Biennale, TS1 in Yangon, the Centre Pompidou in Paris, Artspace Sydney, RAW Material Company in Dakar, and Gudskul, in Jakarta, among others.

Activities

The Samdani Art Foundation collaborates with international institutions to increase scholarship and exhibition opportunities for South Asian Artists, as Bangladesh lacks a developed gallery representation system and formal collecting art institutions. While it works extensively internationally, the Foundation is at its core locally rooted, as evidenced by initiatives such as the Samdani Artist Led Initiatives Forum. Founded in 2017, the Samdani Artist Led Initiatives forum supports the work of artist led grass roots art institutions through education programmes, publishing, and microgrants to support community engaged practice. The ongoing Samdani Seminars program gives Bangladeshi artists access to workshops to explore mediums of artmaking and theory that are not covered in Bangladeshi art education systems. All of the foundation's activities are free of charge and open to the public, most notably the Dhaka Art Summit.

Collection 

Major collection areas of the Samdani Art Foundation include Bangladeshi contemporary artists, Bangladeshi masters and moderns, Indian contemporary artists, Pakistani contemporary artists as well as major artists of the Bengal School of Art. The Samdani collection is international, but the foundation has a focus on collecting South Asian artists and producing new work with international artists who engage deeply with the unique context of Bangladesh. The collection is available to view by appointment at Golpo – the Samdani residence, but a dedicated space for the exhibition of works from the collection is under development in Sylhet at Srihatta, the Samdani Art Centre and Sculpture Park, designed by the Bangladeshi architect Kashef Mahboob Chowdhury (URBANA), a former winner of the Aga Khan Award for Architecture.

Selected areas and artists

Samdani Award 

The Samdani Art Award is Bangladesh's premier art award, aiming to support, promote and highlight Bangladeshi contemporary art. Artists between 20 and 40 years working in Bangladesh are eligible to receive the award. The Samdani Art Award partners with the Delfina Foundation in London, offering the winner a three-month residency with the Delfina Foundation in London.

2012
Khaled Hasan and Musrat Reazi were the recipients of the 2012 art award.
 2014
The winner of the 2014 art award was Ayesha Sultana. The jury for the 2014 award was composed of Aaron Cezar (Director of the Delfina Foundation), Eungie Joo (Curator of the Sharjah Biennale 2015), Jessica Morgan (The Daskalopoulos Curator, Tate), Sandhini Poddar (Curator at the Solomon R. Guggenheim Museum) and Pooja Sood (Director of KHOJ International Artists’ Association).
 2016
The winner of the 2016 art award was Rasel Chowdhury. Daniel Baumann, Director of Kunsthalle Zurich was the curator for the award exhibition and the jury was composed of Cosmin Costinas (Director, Para/Site), Maria Lind (Director, Tensta Kunsthall), Gary Carrion Murayari (Curator, New Museum), Aaron Seeto (Director, Museum of Modern and Contemporary Art in Nusantara (MACAN)) and chaired by Aaron Cezar (Director, Delfina Foundation).
 2018
The winner of the 2018 art award was Mizanur Rahman Chowdhury. The 2018 award exhibition was curated by Simon Castets, Director of the Swiss Institute, New York. The jury was composed of Sheela Gowda (artist), Runa Islam (artist), Subodh Gupta (artist) and Mona Hatoum (artist) and the jury was and chaired by Aaron Cezar (Director, Delfina Foundation).
 2020
The winner of the 2020 art award was Soma Surovi Jannat and Promiti Hossain received a special mention. The 2020 award exhibition was curated by Philippe Pirotte (Rector of the Städelschule and Director of Portikus). The jury was composed of Adrián Villar Rojas (Artist), Carolyn Christov-Bakargiev (Director, Castello di Rivoli), Julie Mehretu (Artist), and Eungie Joo (Curator, SF MoMA) and the jury was chaired by Aaron Cezar (Director, Defina Foundation).

Nadia Samdani

Nadia Samdani  (born 12 December 1981) also known as Nadia Khalil Choudhury, is a British born Bangladeshi businesswoman, art collector, and philanthropist, internationally recognized for her visionary leadership in developing platforms for art and culture in Bangladesh. Along with her husband Rajeeb Samdani, she is the co-founder of Samdani Art Foundation and its headline event the Dhaka Art Summit, which she also leads as its director. She serves as the Vice President of the Alliance Française de Dhaka.

Business 
Nadia is Director of the Director of Golden Harvest Group, one of Bangladesh's leading conglomerates which is active in information technology, commodities, logistics, food processing, agriculture, dairy, aviation, insurance, banking, infrastructure development and real estate. She is the Chairperson of Braintrain Studio, a subsidiary of Golden Harvest which is active in architecture and interior design consultancy in Bangladesh. She is also a Director of the Khalil Group.

Philanthropy and art collection 
Nadia and Rajeeb Samdani were the first and only South Asians to date to receive the Montblanc de la Culture Arts Patronage award in 2017. Nadia is a founding committee member of Tate's South Asian Acquisition Committee and is also a member of Tate's International Council. She is a founding member of the Harvard University Lakshmi Mittal South Asia Institute's Arts Advisory Council and a member of the Alserkal Avenue Programming Committee in Dubai and also serves on the advisory council of the art fair Art Dubai. She has presented the work of the foundation at leading museums and art fairs such as the Royal Ontario Museum, Art Basel, Frieze, among other institutions.

Her art collection has been recognized since 2015 on the Artnews Top 200 collectors listing – one of the sole South Asian collections to receive this recognition. They have also been consistently listed on the ArtReview Power 100 list since 2015, recognizing their contribution to developing the art scene of Bangladesh and connecting it with the wider world. They were also listed as one of “The Deciders” – a list of individuals selected by art collector and producer Swizz Beatz for Art News as forces who will shape the art world in 2020. The Samdani collection is regularly featured in international news publications, most recently in HK Tatler.

As a British born Bangladeshi, Nadia contributes significantly to exchange between British and Bangladeshi artists and institutions through her association with Tate, the support of the Delfina Foundation through the Samdani Art Award, and also through collecting and commissioning major works by British Bangladeshi artists such as Rana Begum and Naeem Mohaiemen. Through the New North and South Network, exhibitions and works from Dhaka Art Summit had a significant presence in the North of England at the Whitworth (Raqib Shaw exhibition co-curated by Dr. Maria Balshaw and Samdani Art Foundation Artistic Director Diana Campbell Betancourt) and at the Liverpool Biennial with a co-commission with Reetu Sattar- a performance and video installation.

Honours, awards and recognition 
Samdani received a “Woman of Inspiration Award” by the Bangladesh chapter of Junior Chamber International (JCI) in 2020 which recognized nine women for their outstanding achievement and contribution to different sectors, including art and culture. She was recognized by the World Economic Forum in 2018 in their “Women of the Decade in Arts Leadership” awards program.

She was appointed Member of the Order of the British Empire (MBE) in the 2022 Birthday Honours for services to global art philanthropy and supporting the arts in South Asia and the United Kingdom.

Notable awards at a glance:

References

Links 
 Samdani Art Foundation

Art and design organizations
Cultural organisations based in Bangladesh